AS Lausanne de Yaoundé is a Cameroonian football club based in Yaoundé. They currently play their home games within the Stade Ahmadou Ahidjo, a stadium they share with fellow Elite One club Canon Yaoundé. As of the 2010–11 season, they currently play in the MTN Elite One, having been promoted from the MTN Elite Two after topping the league in the 2009–10 season.

Honours

Domestic
Elite Two: (1)
Winners: 2009–10

References

External links
AS Lausanne de Yaoundé - Soccerway.com
The Rec.Sport.Soccer Statistics Foundation

Football clubs in Cameroon
Sports clubs in Cameroon